Johnny Tootall is a 2005 television film written and directed by Shirley Cheechoo. The film stars Adam Beach as the titular Johnny Tootall, a young First Nations man who joins the Canadian army to fight in the Bosnian War, in a bid to avoid the responsibility of taking on the role of hereditary chief of his community.

The film was shot around Vancouver Island, British Columbia with the Ahousaht Nations people.

It won "Best Film" honors at the 2005 American Indian Film Festival.

Cast
 Adam Beach as Johnny Tootall
 Nathaniel Arcand as RT
 Alex Rice as Serena
 Sheila Tousey as Agnes (as Sheila May Tousey)
 Ben Cotton as Henry
Miranda Frigon as Luke
Shawn Reis as Lloyd
Randi Knighton as Tiffany
Jazmine Charleson as Dancer 1
 Shyanne Samuel as Dancer 2
Kathleen Ambrose as Dancer 3
Francine Charleson as Dancer 4

References

External links
 

2005 television films
2005 films
Canadian drama television films
First Nations films
English-language Canadian films
Films set in Canada
Films shot in British Columbia
2000s Canadian films